The Civitas Middle/High School was a public secondary school in Fairmount, Baltimore City, Maryland, United States situated in the Walbrook Campus where it was originally established in 2007. Walbrook was currently closed down and two schools operated inside of the building - beside's Civitas, Bulford Drew Jemison Academy was also operating on the other half of the building. Baltimore Civitas Middle/High School was changed into a transformation middle and high school at the beginning of the 2011–12 school year.   Later, the Civitas Middle/High School operated in Dr. Roland N Park Middle School.

Baltimore City Schools selected Civitas as one of several schools to close in 2014.

References

External links
 Official website of Civitas Middle/High School
 Maryland Report Card - Civitas Middle/High School

Educational institutions established in 2007
Public high schools in Maryland
Public middle schools in Maryland
Public schools in Baltimore
Charter schools in Maryland
2007 establishments in Maryland
Southwest Baltimore